Susan Denin (March 22, 1835 Philadelphia – December 4, 1875 Bluffton, Indiana) was an American actress.

Biography
Her father died when she was a child, and her mother married an actor, John Winans. When very young she and her sister Kate took the part of dancing fairies at the National Theatre, Philadelphia. Susan afterward became a favorite in New York City and other parts of the country, and in 1869 made her first appearance in London. She married four times. Her death was the result of a fall on the stage in Indianapolis, Indiana.

References

1835 births
1875 deaths
19th-century American actresses
American stage actresses
Actresses from Philadelphia
Accidental deaths from falls
Accidental deaths in Indiana